HD 91312 is a multiple star system in the northern circumpolar constellation Ursa Major. Faintly visible to the naked eye, it is the brightest star of Ursa Major without Flamsteed designation with a combined apparent visual magnitude of 4.72. The system is located at a distance of 109 light-years from the Sun based on parallax. The radial velocity is poorly constrained, but it appears to be drifting further away at a rate of ~9 km/s.

This was identified as a visual binary by John Herschel in 1831. Variations in the radial velocity as well as direct imaging, indicate the presence of a low-mass stellar companion. This companion is an early-to-mid red dwarf, and orbits the primary on an edge-on orbit with a semi-major axis of 9.7 au. This is a young system with an age of around 200 million years. It display an infrared excess from a circumstellar disk of dusty debris.

This star is relatively bright, but it was rarely included in old catalogues. Catalogues and atlases it was not included in are, for example, those by Ptolemy and all its derivatives and translations (by as-Sufi, al-Biruni, Ulugh Beg, Copernicus, Clavius, etc.), Tycho Brahe, de Houtman, Bayer, Kepler, Schiller, Halley, Flamsteed (as well as published by Carolina Herschel in 1798 catalogue of stars, observed by Flamsteed, but not inserted in his British Catalogue) and Bradley. Catalogues and atlases it was included in are those by Hevelius (1690) (65th in Ursa Major, designated In Ungula sinistri Pedis poster. trium sequens) and Bode (1801) (number 157 of Ursa Major). Bode used extended Bayer designations for some stars, and HD 91312 also was assigned designation "w", whereas original Bayer designations for Ursa Major stars are all Greek letters and Latin letters from "A" to "h".

References

A-type subgiants
Triple stars
Circumstellar disks

Ursa Major (constellation)
Durchmusterung objects
091312
051658
4132